The 1911 Akron Indians season was their fourth season in existence. The team played in the Ohio League and posted a 7–3 record.

Schedule

Game notes

References
Pro Football Archives: Akron Indians 1911

Akron Pros seasons
Akron Pros
Akron Pros